Matt Mignanelli (born 1983) is an American artist best known for his large-scale abstract paintings. Mignanelli lives and works in New York City.

Early life and education
Mignanelli was born in Providence, Rhode Island in 1983. He graduated from the Rhode Island School of Design in 2005, earning a Bachelor of Fine Arts degree. After graduation Mignanelli moved to Manhattan where his work began receiving critical attention both domestically and abroad.

In 2011 he received a grant and was an artist-in-residence at the renowned Vermont Studio Center in Johnson, VT.

Work and critical reception
Mignanelli's paintings explore the relationship between structure and nature, which is relayed through his use of gradating light and structural elements to create enigmatic environments which reference both the urban landscape and vistas from the natural world. He draws inspiration from energy, pattern, light, and the industrial landscape. His process combines incredibly detailed freehand painting of geometric forms, organically accumulated splashes of paint, and diluted washes layered to create gentle gradients over gestural underpaintings. He has said his use of enamel and the color blue makes reference to utilitarian painting applications in municipal and industrial contexts such as mailboxes and dumpsters, with abutting fields of aqueous and luminescent color from nature. Mignanelli's examination of the potential, power, and unwavering focus of the monochrome has been a guiding principle throughout his career.

In his 2018 monograph Blue Paintings published by Denny Dimin Gallery, New York, the curator and museum professional Aaron Levi Garvey lauded Mignanelli's works when writing, "These splendid new works explore the stark contrast between the planned and orderly events of daily life and the journey through the subconscious when allowed to have singular moments to let go of order. The escape which these paintings represent is one that most all of us long for from time to time, a respite from the obligations of being on time or answering calls, texts and emails, the chance to listen to a score or gaze into the sky uninterrupted, so to take it all in. More than just paintings, they are surface studies for points in time that we all deserve."

His work has been featured and reviewed in Interview magazine, ARTnews , Vice, Galerie Magazine, San Francisco Arts Quarterly (SFAQ), Whitewall Magazine, Robb Report, La Repubblica, San Francisco Examiner, GalleristNY, POST NEW, Complex, NY Arts Magazine, Dazed & Confused, and The Art Dossier.

Mignanelli has lectured at Parsons School of Design.

Mignanelli was featured in the 2013 season of VICE Magazines acclaimed video series Art Talk.

In the 2008 Björk music video "Declare Independence", Mignanelli worked alongside director Michel Gondry and can be seen painting in the video.

Exhibitions
Mignanelli's paintings have been exhibited extensively throughout the United States and internationally at the SCAD Museum of Art (Savannah, Georgia), Goss-Michael Foundation (Dallas, Texas), Denny Dimin Gallery (New York City), Hollis Taggart (New York City), 5 Bryant Park (New York City), Richard Heller Gallery (Los Angeles), LUCE Gallery (Turin), Anonymous Gallery (Mexico City), Dubner Moderne (Lausanne, Switzerland), Kristin Hjellegjerde (Berlin), Bleecker Street Arts Club (New York), Artpark Warsaw, Guererro Gallery (San Francisco), Spinello Projects (Miami), Art Copenhagen with Marianne Friis Gallery, and Recoat Gallery (Glasgow).

Mignanelli's selected solo and two person exhibitions include:
 Between Nature & Structure at 5 Bryant Park (New York, 2020–21)
 Matt Mignanelli & Erin O'Keefe at Denny Dimin Gallery (Hong Kong, 2019)
 Nocturnes at Denny Dimin Gallery (New York, 2018)
 Power Dynamics at Dubner Moderne (Lausanne, 2018)
 Matt Mignanelli - Johnny Abrahams, Two On Two at The Hole (New York, 2016)
 Grattan Street at LUCE Gallery (Torino, 2015)
 Matt Mignanelli - Russell Tyler, Between The Lines at Anonymous Gallery (Mexico City, 2015)
 Stories Unfold at Richard Heller Gallery (Los Angeles, 2014)
 Nonstop at Dubner Moderne (Lausanne, 2013)
 Matt Mignanelli - Ryan Wallace at Bleecker Street Arts Club (New York, 2013).

Collections 
Mignanelli has attracted a notable base of American, European, and Asian private collectors. His work is also held in the distinguished public collections of The Estée Lauder Collection, New York, The Morgan Stanley Collection, New York, The Ernesto Esposito Collection, Naples, and The Red Bull Collection, London.

References 

Lieberman, Lynn. “Matt Mignanelli: Between Nature & Structure ~ a Public Art Installation at Five Bryant Park”, GothamToGo, November 2, 2020
Cohen, Alina. “The Artists Everyone Was Talking about during Art Basel in Hong Kong”, Artsy, April 1, 2019.

Further reading

External links 
 
 Matt Mignanelli - Interview Magazine
 Matt Mignanelli -  Hunted Projects Studio visit

1983 births
20th-century American painters
American male painters
21st-century American painters
American contemporary painters
Culture of New York City
Living people
Artists from New York (state)
Rhode Island School of Design alumni
20th-century American male artists